Three is the 2006 debut album by progressive metal band End of Everything.

Track listing 
 "Prototype"
 "God Fearing"
 "Three: 01"
 "Judas Iscariot"
 "Beg To Differ"
 "Three: 02"
 "Black Mask"
 "Calm"
 "Three: 03"
 "Transparent"
 "Uzimaki"
 "Three: 04"

Sources

2006 albums
End of Everything albums